Rihyŏn station is a railway station located in Rihyŏl-li, Sadong-guyŏk, P'yŏngyang, North Korea, on the Myŏngdang Line of the Korean State Railway.

History
The station was opened by the Chosen Government Railway on 1 November 1925, as part of the Myŏngdang Line.

References

Railway stations in North Korea